The  were two Japanese–Yuan trade ships launched in 1342 in order to procure funds for the construction of Tenryū-ji.  They were approved by the Muromachi shogunate, and released to the command of a Hakata merchant named  under the condition that he donate 5,000 kanmon (equivalent to 5,000,000 mon) to the temple irrespective of the mission's commercial success.

References
Kōjien, 6th edition

Ashikaga shōguns
Buddhist temples in Kyoto Prefecture
Currencies of Japan
1340s in Japan
Yuan dynasty
Buddhism in the Muromachi period